Devontae is a given name. Notable people with the name include:

Devontae Booker (born 1992), American football player
Devontae Cacok (born 1996), American basketball player
Devontae Shuler (born 1998), American basketball player

See also
Devonta, given name
Devonte, given name